BUzzards Peak Wilderness is a protected wilderness area to the southeast of the Milpitas Wash Wilderness separated by California State Route 78 in Imperial County, California.  Established in 2019 by the U.S. Congress, the area is managed by the Bureau of Land Management.  Indian Pass Wilderness, Imperial National Wildlife Refuge and the Colorado River are to the south and southeast.
Wildlife includes the desert tortoise, Yuma kingsnake, Colorado River toad, Great Plains toad, tree lizard, burros, mule deer and mountain lion. Vegetation found in the area: cholla and beavertail cactus, ocotillo, palo verde, acacia, ironwood, and the rare California Ditaxis.

See also
List of U.S. Wilderness Areas

References

External links
Buzzards Peak Wilderness Fact Sheet - California Wilderness Coalition

IUCN Category Ib
Wilderness areas of California
Protected areas of Imperial County, California
Protected areas established in 2019
2019 establishments in California